Argentines of Slovene descent, also Slovene Argentines or Argentine Slovenes are the Slovenes residing in Argentina. According to Jernej Zupančič of the Slovenian Academy of Sciences and Arts, they number around 30,000.

History 

The Slovenes in Argentina are descendants of three main groups of immigrants that arrived from the Slovene Lands mostly in the 20th century. The first were economic immigrants from the Prekmurje region and the Hungarian Slovenes. The second, much stronger wave was represented by Slovenes from the Julian March who moved to Argentina in the 1930s to escape the Italian Fascist persecution; they came mostly from the Vipava Valley and the Kras plateau. Their number was estimated at around 30,000. The third wave was composed of Slovene political immigrants that settled in Argentina after 1945 to escape communist persecution. Their number was between 6,000 and 8,000. Most of the descendants of the latter group still use Slovene, including second- and third-generation immigrants.

They are concentrated mainly in Buenos Aires and Greater Buenos Aires, San Carlos de Bariloche, and Mendoza, with some smaller communities settled in Rosario, San Miguel de Tucumán and Paraná.

Slovene Argentines built social clubs where they meet regularly. These clubs act as cultural, sport and religious centres. There is usually also a Saturday primary school in Slovene for children from 5 to 12 years of age in each of these centres. Three of these centres also hold a Saturday secondary school for youths of ages ranging from 13 to 18. At the end of this course, the students usually travel to Slovenia where they attend to a two-week course of language and they know their ancestors' homeland.

They have many cultural, social and religious organizations, almost all of them associated in the Zedinjena Slovenija (United Slovenia) association. These organization edits a weekly newspaper in Slovene called Svobodna Slovenija (Free Slovenia) in which news from Slovenia, the Slovenian community in Argentina and the Slovenian diaspora around the world are published. There are also other publications of cultural, social and religious content. The weekly religious paper Oznanilo (Notification, Announcement) has the highest edition of all publications. Many of the events in the Slovene community in Argentina are published in these paper.

Youths have their organization too, called SDO-SFZ, which was created in March 1949 and accepts Slovene Argentines from 15 to 35 years of age. Their main activities are sport tournaments, cultural acts, leisure activities, and religious and intellectual meetings, which are all held in Slovene. In spite of normally speaking Spanish among themselves, the majority of the youths speak Slovene quite fluently.

Notable personalities 
Andrés Kogovsek, handball player
Cristian Poglajen, volleyball player
Alojz Geržinič, composer
Andrej Bajuk, banker and politician
Anton Novačan, author, politician and diplomat
Bernarda Fink, opera singer
Emilio Komar, philosopher
Franc Rode, Cardinal of the Roman Catholic Church
Ivan Ahčin, journalist, sociologist and politician
Juan Vasle, singer and journalist
Lucas Mario Horvat, football player
Marcos Fink, singer
Pedro Opeka, missionary
Tine Debeljak, literary historian and essayist
Viktor Sulčič, architect
Brenda Asnicar, actress
Luciano Pocrnjic, football player
Andrés Vombergar football player

References

External links
Zedinjena Slovenija - Association of Slovene Organizations in Argentina
SDO-SFZ - Slovene Youth Organization in Argentina

European Argentine
Argentine